Susan Elliott  is an Australian academic specialising in medical education. Since 2017, she has served as the deputy vice-chancellor and vice-president for education at Monash University in Melbourne, Australia. She was previously the deputy vice-chancellor at the University of Melbourne.

In June 2021 Elliott was appointed the Provost and Senior Vice-President of Monash University.

Biography 
Elliott holds degrees in medicine and surgery, and a doctorate in medicine, from the University of Melbourne. She also holds qualifications in health economics and higher education from Monash University and the University of New South Wales.

She is a fellow of the Royal Australasian College of Physicians.

Elliott was the first Australian and first woman elected to lead the Asia Pacific Association for International Education, a regional association for international higher education.

Recognition 
In 2018 Elliott was appointed a Member of the Order of Australia for significant service to education, including as an academic administrator, a clinician in gastroenterology and service to educational institutions in Asia-Pacific.

References

Academic staff of Monash University
Living people
Fellows of the Royal Australasian College of Physicians
Academic staff of the University of Melbourne
University of Melbourne alumni
Members of the Order of Australia
Year of birth missing (living people)